The Wilder Freiger is a mountain in the Stubai Alps on the border between Tyrol, Austria, and South Tyrol, Italy.

External links 

Mountains of the Alps
Mountains of Tyrol (state)
Mountains of South Tyrol
Alpine three-thousanders
Stubai Alps
Austria–Italy border
International mountains of Europe